There Are So Many Things Still to Say is a Syrian documentary film by the director Omar Amiralay. The film was based on an interview with Syrian playwright Saadallah Wannous a few months before he died of cancer.

References

1990s Arabic-language films
1997 films
Syrian documentary films
Films directed by Omar Amiralay
1997 documentary films
Documentary films about the Arab–Israeli conflict
Documentary films about playwrights